The Hinton station is a Via Rail station in Hinton, Alberta. It is on the Canadian National Railway mainline and is served by Via Rail's The Canadian as a flag stop (48 hours advance notice required). 

The station was opened in 1911 by the Grand Trunk Pacific Railway. In 2003, the station building was moved to its current location on Gregg Avenue, where it became the Northern Rockies Museum of Culture and Heritage.

References

External links 

Hinton, Alberta
Via Rail stations in Alberta
Railway stations in Canada opened in 1911
Grand Trunk Pacific Railway stations in Alberta
Canadian National Railway stations in Alberta